"Samidare yo" is the fourth single by Japanese idol group Sakurazaka46 after their 2020 renaming. It was released on April 6, 2022. The title track features Ten Yamasaki as center.

Track listing

Charts

Weekly charts

Year-end charts

References

2022 singles
2022 songs
Sakurazaka46 songs